Jorge Manuel Plácido Bravo da Costa (born 19 June 1964), known as Plácido, is a Portuguese retired footballer who played as a forward.

He played for 11 clubs in a 19-year professional career, in both Portugal and France. He amassed Primeira Liga totals of 192 games and 30 goals over a decade, and was also a Portugal international.

Club career
Born in Luanda, Portuguese Angola, Plácido made his professional and Primeira Liga debut aged 17, with lowly Amora FC. After showing promise at his following two clubs, Vitória F.C. and G.D. Chaves (with eight goals, he helped the latter to qualify for the UEFA Cup for the only time in its history) the 23-year-old signed for FC Porto, but failed to adjust grossly.

Plácido moved to the French Ligue 1 with Racing Club de France Football in summer 1988, but he failed to establish himself, mainly due to a serious injury. In the following transfer window he returned to Portugal after being loaned to Sporting CP, but was also used sparingly; he suffered relegation in his second season with Racing. A second spell at Porto in the 1990–91 campaign also proved unassuming, as he only appeared in four matches for the side, all from the bench.

After one more year in Portugal, at S.C. Salgueiros – where, in the 1991–92 UEFA Cup, he scored the only goal in the first leg of the first round against Zinedine Zidane's AS Cannes, but missed his attempt in the second in a penalty shootout loss – Plácido returned to France, continuing to play until the age of 37 in the country's second, third and fourth tiers in representation of US Créteil-Lusitanos, US Lusitanos and Saint-Denis FC.

International career
Plácido earned three caps for Portugal, scoring twice. His arrival coincided with the defection of practically all of the members of the national team after the infamous Saltillo Affair at the 1986 FIFA World Cup.

On 29 March 1987, Plácido's most important moment in the international scene arrived as his brace helped to avoid a shock defeat in Madeira against Malta for the UEFA Euro 1988 qualifiers (2–2).

|}

Honours
Porto
Primeira Liga: 1987–88
Taça de Portugal: 1987–88, 1990–91
European Super Cup: 1987
Intercontinental Cup: 1987

References

External links

1964 births
Living people
Portuguese footballers
Footballers from Luanda
Association football forwards
Primeira Liga players
F.C. Barreirense players
Amora F.C. players
Vitória F.C. players
G.D. Chaves players
FC Porto players
Sporting CP footballers
S.C. Salgueiros players
Ligue 1 players
Ligue 2 players
Championnat National players
Championnat National 2 players
Racing Club de France Football players
US Créteil-Lusitanos players
Portugal under-21 international footballers
Portugal international footballers
Portuguese expatriate footballers
Expatriate footballers in France
Portuguese expatriate sportspeople in France
Portuguese football managers
Portuguese expatriate football managers
Expatriate football managers in Luxembourg